Benavileh-ye Kohneh (also Romanized as Benāvīleh-ye Kohneh, Benāveyleh Kohneh, Benāveyleh-ye Kohneh, and Benāvīleh Kohneh; also known as Koha) is a village in Nameh Shir Rural District, Namshir District, Baneh County, Kurdistan Province, Iran. At the 2006 census, its population was 120, in 25 families. The village is populated by Kurds.

References 

Towns and villages in Baneh County
Kurdish settlements in Kurdistan Province